The rufous-browed conebill (Conirostrum rufum) is a species of bird in the family Thraupidae.
It is found in Colombia and far western Venezuela.
Its natural habitats are subtropical or tropical moist montane forests and subtropical or tropical high-altitude shrubland.

References

rufous-browed conebill
Birds of the Sierra Nevada de Santa Marta
Birds of the Colombian Andes
rufous-browed conebill
Taxonomy articles created by Polbot